Gene Mitcham (May 18, 1932 – October 27, 2008) was an American football end. He played for the Philadelphia Eagles in 1958.

He died on October 27, 2008, in Phoenix, Arizona at age 76.

References

1932 births
2008 deaths
American football ends
Arizona State Sun Devils football players
Philadelphia Eagles players